is a Japanese rugby union player who plays as a Lock.

References

1990 births
Living people
People from Saitama Prefecture
Sportspeople from Saitama Prefecture
Japanese rugby union players
Japan international rugby union players
Rugby union locks
Shizuoka Blue Revs players
Sunwolves players